1956 in sports describes the year's events in world sport.

Alpine skiing
 The men's Olympic gold medal:
Downhill: Toni Sailer, Austria
 Slalom: Toni Sailer, Austria
 Giant Slalom: Toni Sailer, Austria
 The women's Olympic gold medal:
 Downhill: Madeleine Berthod, Switzerland
 Slalom: Renée Colliard, Switzerland
 Giant Slalom: Ossi Reichert, West Germany
 FIS Alpine World Ski Championships:
 Men's combined champion: Toni Sailer, Austria
 Women's combined champion: Madeleine Berthod, Switzerland

American football
 NFL Championship: the New York Giants won 47–7	over the Chicago Bears at Yankee Stadium in the Bronx
 Orange Bowl (1955 season):
The Oklahoma Sooners won 20–6 over the Maryland Terrapins; voted national champions by AP Poll and Coaches Poll
 1956 NCAA University Division football season:
 The Oklahoma Sooners win the college football national championship (don't participate in a bowl game the following January due to "no-repeat rule")
 1956 NAIA football season
 Montana State and St. Joseph tie for the first ever National Association of Intercollegiate Athletics championship game.

Association football
 European Cup – Real Madrid beat Stade de Reims 4–3 in the inaugural final.

England
 First Division – Manchester United win the 1955–56 title.
 FA Cup – Manchester City beat Birmingham City 3–1.

Netherlands
 Eredivise, a premier football league in Holland, a first regular season games held on September 2.

Athletics
 Betty Cuthbert (Australia) and Bobby Morrow (USA) win three gold medals each in the sprint events at the Olympic Games in Melbourne.

Australian rules football
 Victorian Football League
 May 12: Stuart Spencer kicks 0.11 for Melbourne against Geelong, equalling the record for the most behinds in a match without scoring a goal.
 July 21: Melbourne's run of nineteen consecutive wins, the fourth highest on record, is ended by Footscray, who score 10.12 (72) to the Demons' 7.17 (59).
 September 15: Melbourne wins the 60th VFL Premiership, beating Collingwood 17.19 (121) to 6.12 (48) in the Grand Final.
 Brownlow Medal awarded to Peter Box (Footscray)
 South Australian National Football League
 August 4: Port Adelaide, after starting with thirteen unbeaten games and on target for a rare unbeaten season, are unexpectedly beaten by lowly South Adelaide for their only loss of the season.
 September 29: Port Adelaide beat West Adelaide for their third successive SANFL premiership, scoring 12.9 (81) to 9.11 (65).
 West Australian Football League
 May 12: East Perth kick only 1.4 (10) against Perth at the WACA in heavy rain, with their lone goal coming in total darkness with three minutes remaining. It is not only the lowest score in the WAFL between 1946 and 2002, but the lowest score by any eventual premier club in a major Australian Rules competition since present-day scoring was introduced in the late 1890s.
 October 13: East Perth 10.17 (77) defeat South Fremantle 9.10 (64) for their first senior WAFL premiership since 1936.

Baseball
 April 17 – Luis Aparicio replaces fellow Venezuelan Chico Carrasquel as the White Sox' everyday shortstop. Aparicio, who played 10 seasons with the White Sox, was elected to the Hall of Fame in 1984 and had his #11 retired by the Sox in the same year.
 July 14 – Boston Red Sox lefty Mel Parnell pitches a no-hitter against the Chicago White Sox at Fenway Park, winning 4–0. It is only Parnell's third win against two losses and is the sixth straight loss for second-place Chicago. The no-hitter is the first for the Red Sox since 1923. Parnell will go 4-4 before a torn muscle in his pitching arm ends his career as the Red Sox' winningest southpaw.
 July 25 – Pittsburgh Pirates outfielder Roberto Clemente becomes the first (and to date only) player to hit a walk-off inside-the-park grand slam in a win over the Chicago Cubs at Pittsburgh's old Forbes Field.
 World Series – New York Yankees win 4 games to 3 over the Brooklyn Dodgers. Yankees pitcher Don Larsen, pitches the only perfect game in World Series history, earning himself MVP honors. It was the only no-hitter thrown in any postseason game until October 6, 2010, in his first postseason appearance, Philadelphia Phillies pitcher Roy Halladay pitched a no-hitter against Cincinnati Reds in the NLDS.
 December 1 – Cincinnati slugger Frank Robinson is unanimously voted the NL Rookie of the Year. White Sox shortstop Luis Aparicio is voted AL Rookie of the Year with 22 points, beating out Baltimore's Tito Francona and Rocky Colavito of the Indians.

Basketball
 NCAA Men's Basketball Championship:
 San Francisco wins 83–71 over Iowa
 NBA Finals:
 Philadelphia Warriors won 4 games to 1 over the Fort Wayne Pistons

Boxing
 March 19 – At age 48, Dutch boxer Bep van Klaveren contests his last match in Rotterdam.
 April 27  – Rocky Marciano retires as the only undefeated Heavyweight Champion of the world with a perfect record (49-0).
 November 30, in Chicago – Floyd Patterson knocks out Archie Moore in the 5th round to win the vacant World Heavyweight title.

Canadian football
 Grey Cup – Edmonton Eskimos win 50–27 over the Montreal Alouettes

Cycling
 Giro d'Italia won by Charly Gaul of Luxembourg
 Tour de France – Roger Walkowiak of France
 UCI Road World Championships – Men's road race – Rik Van Steenbergen of Belgium

Field hockey
 Olympic Games (Men's Competition) in Melbourne, Australia
 Gold Medal: India
 Silver Medal: Pakistan
 Bronze Medal: West Germany

Figure skating
 1956 Winter Olympics:
 Men's champion: Hayes Alan Jenkins, United States
 Ladies' champion: Tenley Albright, United States
 Pair skating champions: Elisabeth Schwarz & Kurt Oppelt, Austria
 World Figure Skating Championships:
 Men's champion: Hayes Alan Jenkins, United States
 Ladies' champion: Carol Heiss, United States
 Pair skating champions: Elisabeth Schwarz & Kurt Oppelt, Austria
 Ice dancing champions: Pamela Weight & Paul Thomas (skater), Great Britain
 European Figure Skating Championships:
 Men's champion: Alain Giletti, France
 Ladies' champion: Ingrid Wendl, Austria
 Pair skating champions: Elisabeth Schwarz & Kurt Oppelt, Austria
 Ice dancing champions: Pamela Weight & Paul Thomas (skater), Great Britain

Golf
Men's professional
 Masters Tournament – Jack Burke, Jr.
 U.S. Open – Cary Middlecoff
 British Open – Peter Thomson
 PGA Championship – Jack Burke, Jr.
 PGA Tour money leader – Ted Kroll – $72,836
Men's amateur
 British Amateur – John Beharrell
 U.S. Amateur – Harvie Ward
Women's professional
 Women's Western Open – Beverly Hanson
 LPGA Championship – Marlene Hagge
 U.S. Women's Open – Kathy Cornelius
 Titleholders Championship – Louise Suggs
 LPGA Tour money leader – Marlene Hagge – $20,235

Harness racing
 The United States Pacing Triple Crown races is created with the addition of the Messenger Stakes.
 Cane Pace – Noble Adios
 Little Brown Jug – Noble Adios
 Messenger Stakes – Belle Acton
 United States Trotting Triple Crown races:
 Hambletonian – The Intruder
 Yonkers Trot – Add Hanover
 Kentucky Futurity – Scott Frost
 Australian Inter Dominion Harness Racing Championship:
 Pacers: Gentlemen John

Horse racing
Steeplechases
 Cheltenham Gold Cup – Limber Hill
 Grand National – ESB
Flat races
 Australia – Melbourne Cup won by Evening Peal
 Canada – Queen's Plate won by Canadian Champ
 France – Prix de l'Arc de Triomphe won by Ribot
 Ireland – Irish Derby Stakes won by Talgo
 English Triple Crown races:
 2,000 Guineas Stakes – Gilles de Retz
 The Derby – Lavandin
 St. Leger Stakes – Cambremer
 United States Triple Crown races:
 May 5 – Kentucky Derby – Needles
 Preakness Stakes – Fabius
 Belmont Stakes – Needles

Ice hockey
 Art Ross Trophy as the NHL's leading scorer during the regular season: Jean Beliveau, Montreal Canadiens
 Hart Memorial Trophy for the NHL's Most Valuable Player: Jean Beliveau, Montreal Canadiens
 Stanley Cup – Montreal Canadiens win 4 games to 1 over the Detroit Red Wings
 World Hockey Championship
 Men's champion: Soviet Union defeated the United States
 NCAA Men's Ice Hockey Championship – University of Michigan Wolverines defeat Michigan Technological University Huskies 7–5 in Colorado Springs, Colorado
 HC Dukla Jihlava was founded in Vysocina Region, Czechoslovakia, present day of Czech Republic.

Motorsport

Rugby league
1955–56 European Rugby League Championship
1956 New Zealand rugby league season
1956 NSWRFL season
1955–56 Northern Rugby Football League season / 1956–57 Northern Rugby Football League season

Rugby union
 62nd Five Nations Championship series is won by Wales
 New Zealand All Blacks defeats South African Springboks 3–1 in a Test series

Snooker
 World Snooker Championship – Fred Davis beats John Pulman 38-35

Tennis
Australia
 Australian Men's Singles Championship – Lew Hoad (Australia) defeats Ken Rosewall (Australia) 6–4, 3–6, 6–4, 7–5
 Australian Women's Singles Championship – Mary Carter Reitano (Australia) defeats Thelma Coyne Long (Australia) 3–6, 6–2, 9–7
England
 Wimbledon Men's Singles Championship – Lew Hoad (Australia) defeats Ken Rosewall (Australia) 6–2, 4–6, 7–5, 6–4
 Wimbledon Women's Singles Championship – Shirley Fry Irvin (USA) defeats Angela Buxton (Great Britain) 6–3, 6–1
France
 French Men's Singles Championship – Lew Hoad (Australia) defeats Sven Davidson (Sweden) 6–4, 8–6, 6–3
 French Women's Singles Championship – Althea Gibson (USA) defeats Angela Mortimer (Great Britain) 6–0, 12–10
USA
 American Men's Singles Championship – Ken Rosewall (Australia) defeats Lew Hoad (Australia) 4–6, 6–2, 6–3, 6–3
 American Women's Singles Championship – Shirley Fry Irvin (USA) defeats Althea Gibson (USA) 6–3, 6–4
Davis Cup
 1956 Davis Cup –  5–0  at Memorial Drive Tennis Centre (grass) Adelaide, Australia

Volleyball
 Men's World Championship in Paris won by Czechoslovakia

Olympic Games
 1956 Summer Olympics takes place in Melbourne, Australia
 Equestrian events take place in Stockholm, Sweden, due to Australian quarantine laws.
 USSR wins the most medals (98), and the most gold medals (37).
 1956 Winter Olympics takes place in Cortina d'Ampezzo, Italy
 USSR wins the most medals (16), and the most gold medals (7).

Awards
 Associated Press Male Athlete of the Year – Mickey Mantle, Major League Baseball
 Associated Press Female Athlete of the Year – Pat McCormick, Diving

References

 
Sports by year